Upper Lydbrook railway station served the civil parish of Lydbrook, Gloucestershire, England, from 1875 to 1929 on the Severn and Wye Railway.

History 
The station was opened on 23 September 1875 by the Severn and Wye Railway. Behind the station was the goods yard. The layout of this was modified in 1891 to accommodate a nearby colliery that was opening. The roads nearby were modified twice to allow easier access. The station closed on 8 July 1929. The only trains after this date were excursions.

References 

Disused railway stations in Gloucestershire
Railway stations in Great Britain opened in 1875
Railway stations in Great Britain closed in 1929
1875 establishments in England
1929 disestablishments in England